Plainfaing is a commune in the Vosges department in Grand Est in northeastern France.

Geography
The commune is positioned in the east of the department, at the foot of the 949 meter high Bonhomme Pass (Col du Bonhomme), between  Saint-Dié-des-Vosges to the west and Colmar in neighbouring Alsace to the east.   The river Meurthe rises in the nearby commune of Le Valtin and crosses Plainfaing from the south, and is joined by the stream from the Chaume valley.   A designated natural reserve of half a square kilometre is shared between Valtin and Plainfaing, and includes the peaks of the Tanet and the Gazon of the Faing.

Demographic evolution

Born in Plainfaing
Raymond Ruyer, philosopher

See also
Communes of the Vosges department

References

Communes of Vosges (department)